These are the albums that reached number one on the Billboard Top R&B/Hip-Hop Albums chart in 2003.

Chart history

See also
2003 in music
R&B number-one hits of 2003 (USA)

2003